Antonije "Anta" Bogićević (born around 1758 in Klupci near Loznica, died in 1813) was a Serbian voivode during the First Serbian Uprising. Songs of his heroic exploits were was sung by the famous guslar Filip Višnjić in the song "Battle of Loznica". Today one of the primary schools in Loznica bears his name.

First Serbian Uprising
Antonije Bogićević, though born in Serbia, his ancestors came from Bosnia.
During the First Serbian Uprising, he joined the insurgents and worked in organizing the government and supplying the army. He was appointed duke in 1807 of Jadar defending this troubled area from Turkish incursions from Bosnia and Herzegovina. He fought the Turks in Krupanj, Rozaje, Rađevo Polje, and most often in Loznica, where several bloody battles were fought with the Bosnian Turkish army. He was wounded in one of those fights.

The most significant was the battle for Loznica, fought on the 5 and 6 October 1810, according to the old calendar. Under Ali Pasha Vidajić, 30,000 Turks descended along the Drina in riverboats called šajka to the Tičar field near Loznica. The fortified city wall was defended by 1,200 Serbs, led by the Duke of Loznica, Antonije "Anta" Bogićević. The siege lasted twelve days. Assessing that he could not resist the Turkish attacks, Duke Anta turned to Luka Lazarević for help. According to the report on the siege of Loznica, and after Karađorđe dislodged Hurshid Pasha from Morava, he hurried to help with almost the entire army from Šumadija and 200 Cossacks.

It seems that Karađorđe estimated that the most decisive battle in 1810 would ultimately take place right there. The importance of Karađorđe attached to the battle is also shown by the letter sent to Petar Dobrnjac asking him for reinforcements:

"Don't hesitate for a minute. Every minute is worth it, I really care if the army arrives on the Drina a minute earlier."

Luka Lazarević and Jakov Nenadović came to the rescue with the army of the Šabac and Valjevo districts. The decisive battle began on the morning of 6 October 1810. Karađorđe later informed Miloš Obrenović about this:

"Both the Turks and we went out into the field, and a bloody fight ensued with cannons and rifles ablaze that after eight hours there was no greater than this battle."

This victory of the Serbian army is one of the most significant in the First Serbian Uprising. When Duke Anta Bogićević died in 1813, his son Bogosav Bogićević was appointed duke. He was buried in Loznica on the trench, but the Turks took out his body, cut off his head and threw his body into the river Štira. However, patriots later secretly removed his bones and buried him next to the church in Loznica. His daughter Tomanija married Jevrem Obrenović, and his son Miloš was killed by Toma Vučić Perišić when he quelled the Katan rebellion in 1844. The grandson of Tomanija and Jevrem Obrenović became the first king of modern Serbia, Milan Obrenović IV.

Legacy
There is a public school in Serbia named after him.

See also
 List of Serbian Revolutionaries

References 

1758 births
1813 deaths
People from Loznica
People of the Second Serbian Uprising
Serbian military leaders
Serbian revolutionaries
19th-century Serbian people